The 13th AVN Awards ceremony, organized by Adult Video News (AVN) honored the best pornographic films of 1995 and took place on January 7, 1996 at the Aladdin Theatre for the Performing Arts in Paradise, Nevada, beginning at 8:15 p.m. PST / 11:15 p.m. EST. During the ceremony, AVN presented AVN Awards in 97 categories. The ceremony, taped for broadcast in the United States by Spice Networks, was produced and directed by Gary Miller and Mark Stone. Comedian Bobby Slayton hosted the show for the first time, alongside actress co-hosts Jenna Jameson and Julia Ann. Hall of Fame inductees were honored at a gala held a month earlier.

Latex won the most statuettes, taking 11. Other winners included Blue Movie with four awards and gay video The Renegade with three.

Winners and nominees 

The winners were announced during the awards ceremony on January 7, 1996. Latex won 11 of the 14 categories in which it was nominated. Rocco Siffredi became the first two-time winner of the Male Performer of the Year award. Jenna Jameson was the first Best New Starlet award winner to also take home a Best Actress award. Mike Horner won his fourth Best Actor—Film award.

Major awards

Winners are listed first, highlighted in boldface, and indicated with a double dagger.

Additional award winners

These awards were also announced at the awards show, most in a winners-only segment for technical achievements read by Dyanna Lauren or a second winners-only segment read by Julia Ann.

 Best Actress, Video: Jenna Jameson, Wicked One
 Best All-Girl Feature: Buttslammers 10
 Best All-Girl Sex Scene, Film: Felecia, Misty Rain, Jenteal; Fantasy Chamber 
 Best All-Sex Film: The Player
 Best Alternative Adult Feature Film: Under Lock & Key 
 Best Alternative Adult Film Featurette or Specialty Tape: The Best of Pamela Anderson 
 Best Alternative Adult Video: Buttman at Nudes a Poppin' 2 
 Best Amateur Tape: New Faces, Hot Bodies 17 
 Best Amateur Series: Mike Hott Video 
 Best Anal Sex Scene, Film: Gaping anus scene; Marquis de Sade 
 Best Anal Sex Scene, Video: Careena Collins & Jake Steed—blindfold anal; Bottom Dweller 33 1/3 
 Best Anal-Themed Feature: Anal Intruder 9: The Butt from Another Planet 
 Best Art Direction, Film: Cinesex 1 & 2
 Best Art Direction, Video: Latex 
 Best Bisexual Video: Remembering Times Gone Bi
 Best Box Cover Concept: Strip Tease 
 Best Box Cover Concept—Gay Video: Courting Libido
 Best CD-ROM Graphics/Art Direction: Virtual Valerie 2
 Best CD-ROM Photo Disk: Visions of Erotica
 Best Cinematography: Bill Smith, Sex 2 
 Best Compilation Tape: Pussyman 11: Prime Cuts 
 Best Continuing Video Series: Takin' It to the Limit 
 Best Director, Bisexual Video: James C. Stark, Remembering Times Gone Bi
 Best Director, Gay Video: John Rutherford, The Renegade
 Best Editing for a Film: Michael Zen, Blue Movie 
 Best Editing—Gay Video: Josh Eliot, Jawbreaker
 Best Ethnic-Themed Video: My Baby Got Back 6 
 Best European Release (The Hot Vidéo Award): Hamlet: For the Love of Ophelia (Italy)
 Best Explicit Series: Vivid 4-Hour Series 
 Best Featurette Tape: Sodomania 12
 Best Foreign Feature: The Tower 1, 2 & 3
 Best Foreign Featurette Tape: Private Video Magazine 20 
 Best Gang Bang Tape: 30 Men for Sandy 
 Best Gay Alternative Video Release: Siberian Heat
 Best Gay Solo Video: Rex Chandler: One on One
 Best Gay Specialty Release: Pissed
 Best Gay Video: The Renegade
 Best Gonzo Video: Pool Party at Seymore's 1 & 2
 Best Gonzo Series: The Voyeur

 Best Group Sex Scene, Film: Orgy Finale; Borderline 
 Best Group Sex Scene, Video: Stephanie Sartori, Erika Bella, Mark Davis, Sean Michaels; World Sex Tour, Vol. 1 
 Best Interactive CD-ROM: Space Sirens 2
 Best Interactive CD-ROM Game: Adventures of Seymore Butts II: In Pursuit of Pleasure
 Best Music: Dino Ninn, Latex 
 Best Music, Gay Video: Sharon Kane & Casey Jordan, Johnny Rey's Sex Series 2: Score of Sex
 Best Newcomer, Gay Video: Ken Ryker
 Best Non-Sex Performance, Film or Video: Veronica Hart, Nylon 
 Best Non-Sexual Performance—Gay, Bi, Trans Video: Lana Luster, Driven Home
 Best Original CD-ROM Concept: Virtual Sex Shoot
 Best Overall Marketing Campaign: Virtual Max 3-D System 
 Best Packaging, Film: Borderline
 Best Packaging—Gay Video: An Officer and His Gentleman
 Best Packaging, Specialty: The Journal of O
 Best Packaging, Video: Style 2 
 Best Performer—Gay Video: Ken Ryker, The Renegade
 Best Pro-Am Series: Up and Cummers 
 Best Pro-Am Tape: More Dirty Debutantes 38 
 Best Screenplay, Film: Raven Touchstone, Cinesex 1 & 2
 Best Screenplay, Gay Video: Jerry Douglas, The Diamond Stud
 Best Screenplay, Video: Jace Rocker, Risque Burlesque
 Best Sex Scene, Gay Video: Daryl Brock, Chip Daniels, Rod Majors, Ty Russell, Scott Russell; Jawbreaker
 Best Special Effects: Latex 
 Best Specialty Tape, Bondage: Kym Wilde's On the Edge 23 
 Best Specialty Tape, Big Bust: Tits 
 Best Specialty Tape, Other Genre: Leg Tease 
 Best Specialty Tape, Spanking: Blistered Your Buns 
 Best Supporting Actor, Film: Steven St. Croix, Forever Young 
 Best Supporting Performer, Gay Video: Johnny Rahm, All About Steve
 Best Tease Performance: Christy Canyon, Comeback 
 Best Trailer: Latex 
 Best Transsexual Video: A Real Man 
 Best Video Editing: D3, Latex 
 Best Videography: Barry Harley, Latex 
 Best Videography—Gay Video: Todd Montgomery, Big River
 Gay Video Performer of the Year: J. T. Sloan

Honorary AVN Awards

Special Achievement Award 

 Ed Powers, 4-Play Video

Hall of Fame 

AVN Hall of Fame inductees for 1996, announced at a gala a month prior to the AVN Awards show, were: Andrew Blake, Gino Colbert, The Dark Brothers, Ashlyn Gere, Savannah, Matt Sterling, Jennifer Welles, Tori Welles

Multiple nominations and awards 

Latex won the most statuettes, taking 11 of the 14 categories in which it was nominated. Other winners included Blue Movie with four awards and gay video The Renegade with three. Two statuettes went to each of Borderline, Bottom Dweller 33 1/3, Cinesex 1 & 2, Dear Diary, Jawbreaker, Private Video Magazine 20, Remembering Times Gone Bi and Risque Burlesque.

Presenters and performers 

The following individuals, in order of appearance, presented awards or performed musical numbers or comedy. The show's trophy girls were Houston and Tracy Love.

Presenters

Performers

Ceremony information 

The 13th AVN Awards Show marked the first time the awards show was open to the public. In addition, Bobby Slayton was the show's first host who was not affiliated with the adult film industry. The theme of the show was "Give me liberty."

Several other people and elements were also involved with the production of the ceremony. Gary Miller and Mark Stone served as producer and director for the show while Marco Polo served as director of the broadcast. Mark Stone served as musical director for the ceremony. Choreographer Serenity supervised the performances of the dance numbers. Ventriloquist act Otto & George performed standup comedy during the proceedings.

Best Sex Comedy was a new category at this year's show.

Latex was announced as both the top selling movie and the top renting movie of the year.

Adult PC Guide magazine noted the show was videotaped for broadcast on Spice Networks and featured "a huge set, motion-controlled cameras and a production that would have rivaled the Oscars." A VHS videotape of the show was also published and sold by VCA Pictures.

Critical reviews

High Society magazine said, "Nothing that happened at the Oscars could possibly top this evening for excitement." Adult Cinema Review called the show "dazzling." It noted serving food in an auditorium gave way to chaos and "thousands of jabbering people made it hard to accomplish anything but light conversation," however, "there were no real complaints."

In Memoriam 

Paul Fishbein "memorialized three performers in the industry who passed away this year:" Alex Jordan, Cal Jammer and Kristi Lynn.

Notes

Bibliography

External links
 
 Adult Video News Awards  at the Internet Movie Database
 
 
 

13th AVN Awards
1996 film awards
Zappos Theater